The Melberger Award was given annually to an outstanding U.S. college football player in Division III of the National Collegiate Athletic Association. The award was named after Clifford Melberger, a captain of the 1960 Bucknell University football team, and is presented by Diversified Information Technologies, which Mr. Melberger leads as president.

The Melberger had been one of two awards given to Division III football players, the other being the better-known Gagliardi Trophy. The focus of the two awards has historically been slightly different. The Gagliardi factors in community service, academics, and athletics; the Melberger is, at least theoretically, presented to the best athlete. In recent years the Melberger has fallen into disfavor due to poor publicity and coordination by the firm which now sponsors the award. From the period 2002–2004, the award was given not to the nation's most outstanding Division III football players, but to the player in the local region who could attend (at their own cost) the awards ceremony in Wilkes-Barre, Pennsylvania. This resulted in the award being given to players who would often struggle to make an all-region team, let alone be named the best player in the country. Prior to 2002, the Melberger Award was funded and supported by the Downtown Wilkes-Barre Touchdown Club. The award was last given in 2011.

Winners

External links
 Melberger Award drops the ball

Awards established in 1993
College football national player awards
NCAA Division III football